Ouhoumoudou Mahamadou (born 1954) is a Nigerien politician of the Nigerien Party for Democracy and Socialism (PNDS-Tarayya) who has been serving as Prime Minister of Niger since 3 April 2021.

Mahamadou served in the government of Niger as Minister of Mines, Energy, and Industry from 1991 to 1993 and as Minister of Finance from April 2011 to April 2012. He has been Director of the Cabinet of the President since 2015.

Career
In the transitional government of Prime Minister Ahmadou Cheiffou, appointed on 7 November 1991, Mahamadou was included as Minister of Mines, Energy, Industry, and Crafts. He was retained in his post in a cabinet reshuffle on 31 January 1993. Multiparty elections were held in February 1993, bringing the transition to an end; Mahamadou was not included in the government that was appointed on 23 April 1993. He served as Deputy Executive Secretary of the Economic Community of West African States (ECOWAS) under the leadership of Executive Secretary Édouard Benjamin from 1993 until 1998 and then worked as Lutheran World Relief's Regional Representative for West Africa.

After PNDS President Mahamadou Issoufou won the January–March 2011 presidential election and took office as President of Niger, Ouhoumoudou Mahamadou was appointed to the government as Minister of Finance on 21 April 2011.

Mahamadou served as Minister of Finance for a little less than a year; he was dismissed from the government on 2 April 2012. Later in the same month, he was appointed as Director-General of Banque Internationale pour l’Afrique au Niger (BIA-Niger), a major bank.

Mahamadou was appointed as Director of the Cabinet of the President on 4 June 2015. After Issoufou was sworn in for a second term, he retained Mahamadou in his post as Director of the Cabinet of the President on 11 April 2016.

Prime Minister 

Mahamadou became Prime Minister on 3 April 2021.

References

1954 births
Living people
Bankers
Finance ministers of Niger
Nigerien politicians
Prime Ministers of Niger
Energy ministers of Niger
Mining ministers of Niger
Industry ministers of Niger